Gerald Adrian Ouellette (born November 1, 1938) is a Canadian retired professional ice hockey player who played 34 games in the National Hockey League during the 1960–61 season with the Boston Bruins. The rest of his career, which lasted from 1959 to 1971, was spent in various minor leagues.

During his brief stint with the Boston Bruins in 1960–61, Ouellette scored 9 points including 5 goals. He returned to the Bruins farm teams for four seasons before being picked up by the Buffalo Bisons of the American Hockey League (AHL). With the Bisons, Ouelette served as team captain during their 1969–70 Calder Cup championship win. He then captained the Omaha Knights of the Central Hockey League (CHL) to the Adams Cup in 1970–71 and later joined the Campbellton Tigers of the North Shore New Brunswick senior league where he helped them win the Hardy Cup in 1972, 1977 and 1988; the last two wins as coach.

Career statistics

Regular season and playoffs

References

External links
 

1938 births
Living people
Boston Bruins players
Buffalo Bisons (AHL) players
Canadian ice hockey right wingers
Ice hockey people from New Brunswick
Kingston Frontenacs (EPHL) players
Minneapolis Bruins players
Omaha Knights (CHL) players
People from Grand Falls, New Brunswick
Providence Reds players
San Francisco Seals (ice hockey) players